CJZ, formerly Cordell Jigsaw Productions, is an Australian production company which have produced more original primetime series than other independent production groups in Australia and New Zealand. The company produces content across all genres, with a focus on factual, entertainment, comedy and drama programming.

CJZ was co-founded by Michael Cordell and Nick Murray, who serve as the company's managing director and creative director respectively. The director of production is Toni Malone and the CEO is Matt Campbell, who is former director of content at SBS and former managing director of Shine Australia.

CJZ also owns Greenstone TV, a New Zealand based television company, with offices in Auckland and Dubai. Greenstone TV was founded in 1994 by John Harris. In December 2013, Greenstone TV was purchased by Australian production company CJZ.

List of CJZ shows
A list of CJZ's programming is below:

Greenstone TV shows

References

Television production companies of Australia
Australian companies established in 2005
Mass media companies established in 2005
Companies based in Sydney